Malla is a village located in the Shimoga District of Karnataka, India.

Administration
Malla village is administrated by Sarpanch (Head of Village), who is elected representative of the village, according to Indian Panchayti Raj Act.

Literacy 
According to the 2011 Indian Census, the literacy rate of Malla is 71.6%. The village has lower literacy rate compared to 72.1% of Shimoga district. The male literacy rate is 82.27 percent and the female literacy rate is 61.36 percent in Malla village.

References

Villages in Shimoga district